Hayzlett is a surname. Notable people with the surname include:

Gary Hayzlett (born 1941), American politician
Jeffrey W. Hayzlett (born 1960/61), American businessman